Gaetano Filangieri, prince of Satriano (Naples, 1824–1892) was a prominent Neapolitan art historian and collector who founded the Museo Civico Filangieri.

He inherited the titles of prince of Satriano in Calabria and duke of Taormina from his father.

He was a member of the prominent Neapolitan family of the Filangieri, the son of Carlo Filangieri and the grandson of Gaetano Filangieri.

He was vice president of the Società di Storia Patria, director of the Consulta Araldica, and president of the museum he founded.

His work was pursued by his grandson Riccardo Filangieri di Candida Gonzaga.

1824 births
1892 deaths
Italian art historians
Italian princes